Kcyninka is a river of Poland, a tributary of the Noteć near Osiek nad Notecią.

Rivers of Poland
Rivers of Greater Poland Voivodeship
Rivers of Kuyavian-Pomeranian Voivodeship